This article contains some content translated from the existing Japanese Wikipedia article at :jp:enra

Japanese performing arts company enra (stylized in lowercase Latin letters.) combines video art with live performance, synchronizing human body motion with computer graphics. Established March 1, 2012, as of 2019 enra is a collective centered around six performers: Tsuyoshi Kaseda, Maki Yokoyama, Tachun, Kazunori Ishide, Takako Morimoto, and Aoi Nonaka.

Tradition and origin 
The Tokyo-based performing arts and production company seeks to create the ultimate union between motion graphics and live performance. The intent is to synchronize on-screen images with dance and other forms of live expression. Made up of eight individual performers, enra incorporates martial arts (especially wushu), rhythmic gymnastics, ballet, animation dance, juggling (especially with the diabolo), and club dance into its performances.

Performances by enra consist of a synchronized fusion of motion graphics (video art) and live performance (contemporary dance in a variety of genres) in front of a screen. The group regularly performs all over the world, and has received high praise not only in its native Japan, but also in Europe, North America, East and Southeast Asia, and the Middle East.

In Japan, enra performed as a guest of the prime minister of Japan at the official welcoming dinner for the International Olympic Committee (IOC) during its evaluation of the 2020 Tokyo Olympics plan, an event that also served to commemorate the 50-year anniversary of the 1964 Tokyo Olympics.

FILMS, a homage to movies, was performed by enra to open the award ceremony at the 68th Festival de Cannes, where the group also walked the red carpet.

In March 2016, enra kicked off its 2016 Japan tour with a public performance at Kitazawa Town Hall in Shimokitazawa, Tokyo.

enra walked the red carpet a second time at the Lunas del Auditorio ceremony at the National Auditorium in Mexico City in October 2016, where they performed as a special guest.

Name origin 
According to the Mainichi Shimbun, "The group's name is derived from the smoke-like shape-shifting Japanese yōkai spirit, Enenra".【グループ名は、煙のようにさまざまな形に姿を変える日本の妖怪「煙々羅」にちなんだ。】

Performance history

2012 
 Japan: Short Shorts Film Festival & Asia 2012 Award Ceremony 
 Japan: Kiryu Short Film Festival 2012 Opening Act 
 Japan: Momoiro Clover Z X’mas Eve Live 
 Japan: Information & Media 10th Anniversary, Doshisha Women's College of Liberal Arts 
 Japan: IOC Evaluation Commission Visit - Prime Minister's Tokyo 2020 Dinner

2013 
 Hong Kong: Citibank ULTIMA Card Presentation 
 Indonesia: NET. Mediatama Indonesia Launch Event 
 Romania: Summer Well Music Festival 2013, Bucharest 
 Japan: Honda Fit & Fit Hybrid Unveiling 
 Japan: Mori Art Museum 10th Anniversary Gala Dinner 
 Japan: Sharp “AQUOS XL10” Web Commercial 
 China: “primitive” Guest Performance at Hermès Forum

2014 
 Japan: Patek Philippe 175th Anniversary Event 
 Japan: Bioderma Japan Anniversary Party 
 Qatar: “Japanese Projection” Show in Doha 
 France: CB 30th Anniversary - Extreme Event at Le Petit Palais, Paris 
 France: Performance at Opéra Comique, Paris 
 Germany: Zeiss AG "ZEISS Forum” 
 Spain: TV “El Hormiguero” 
 Singapore: Samarpana 2014: The Asian Festival of Classical Dance 
 Japan: “→PJ←WONDERLAND~” with →Pia-no-jaC← at Zepp Tokyo 
 Czech Republic: Volkswagen Passat 8 Event 
 Japan: “primitive” Show in Tokyo 
 China: “primitive” Show in Hong Kong 
 Singapore: Morgan Stanley Gala Dinner 
 SK-II Web Commercial

2015 
 USA: 16th Contemporary Dance Showcase: Japan + East Asia 
 USA: 31st Space Symposium 
 China: Hewlett-Packard Event 
 Turkey: Gala Modern at the Istanbul Museum of Modern Art 
 Switzerland: IWC Gala Dinner 
 Costa Rica: TEDxPuraVida
 Bahrain: Corporate Event 
 USA: TV “America’s Got Talent”
 France: 68th Festival de Cannes - Award Ceremony 
 Singapore: "primitive" Show at Esplanade Presents "Flipside 2015" 
 Switzerland: Red Cross Ball – Gala Dinner, Geneva 
 Taiwan: Performances at Taiwan National Theater 
 Romania: Orange 4U Performance 
 Japan: Lexus 10th Anniversary Event 
 USA Tour 2015
 Birmingham, Alabama
 Memphis, Tennessee
 Durango, Colorado
 Detroit, Michigan
 Knoxville, Tennessee 
 Portugal: Residency at Centro Cultural de Belém, Lisbon

2016 
 India: Corporate Event
 Japan: Google Brandcast Tokyo
 Italy: Corporate Event at Pala Alpitour 
 UAE: YPO EDGE Conference Opening in Dubai
 Australia: Corporate Event 
 Kuwait: Porsche 911 Launch Event 
 Japan: Performance with Nobuaki Kaneko of Rize in Tokyo 
 Argentina: Coca-Cola Rebranding Event in Buenos Aires
 Singapore: Michelin Guide 2016 Award Ceremony & Gala Dinner
 Japan: "planet" in Achimura, Nagano
 Portugal: Guest Performance at European Inventor Award Ceremony in Lisbon
 Japan: "newton" at 21st Century Museum of Contemporary Art, Kanazawa
 Germany: Corporate Event in Berlin
 United States: Future of StoryTelling Summit in New York City
 Mexico: Lunas del Auditorio Guest Performance
 Japan: PROXIMA Tour 2016
 Tokyo
 Toyama
 Sendai
 Sapporo
 Niigata
 Okayama
 Hyogo
 Kurume (Fukuoka)
 Nagano
 Osaka
 United States: PROXIMA North America Tour 2016
 Newport News, VA
 Muncie, IN
 Skokie, IL (Chicago)
 Los Angeles, CA
 Taiwan: PROXIMA at the Taichung Arts Festival
 Mexico: PROXIMA North America Tour 2016: PROXIMA in Mexico City
 UAE: ADIPEC Awards Gala Dinner in Abu Dhabi
 Japan: Hublot All Black Night Event
 Japan: BiG-i Art Festival

2017
 Japan: “PARALLEL WORLD” at Akasaka Blitz with →Pia-no-jaC← in Tokyo
 Japan: Performance at International Luxury Travel Market
 Japan: Performance at Audi Event
 Macau: Performance at Sands Macau
 UAE: Private Event
 Kuwait: Kuwait K-IT Day
 Australia: Corporate Event
 USA: Palm Springs Art Museum Gala: Embracing the Abstract
 USA: PROXIMA at Harris Center in Folsom, CA
 France: Pyramides d'Argent de la Fédération des Promoteurs, Marseille
 USA: Residency at Dollywood
 Japan: Show at Toin Gakuen
 Japan: Event in Miyazaki
 Mexico: "PROXIMA" at Teatro de la Ciudad Esperanza Iris, Mexico City
 Mexico: "PROXIMA" at Forum Cultural Guanajuato, León, Guanajuato
 Japan: Dassault Systèmes 3DEXPERIENCEFORUM
 Thailand: J Series Festival

2018
 South Korea: 4IR Performing Arts Conference
 Spain: Corporate Event in Castellón
 China: China International Youth Arts Festival
 UAE: Performances at ADIPEC, Abu Dhabi
 China: "VOYAGER" in Shanghai
 Thailand: Japan Expo
 Japan: Dealer Event for Honda Canada
 Japan: "GHOST" Premiere in Sapporo
 Japan: "pleiades" in Achi Mura

2019
 UAE: Performance at WFES, Abu Dhabi
 Egypt: Performance at EGYPS, Cairo
 Singapore: Corporate Event
 Japan, Taiwan, India: Sands Macao Roadshow Event
 Switzerland: Performances at Numerik Games Festival
 Russia: Corporate Event in Ekaterinburg
 Hong Kong: JNA Awards 2019 Ceremony and Gala Dinner
 Oman: Marriott International Event
 Japan: Winter Night Tour in Achi Mura

References

Further reading
 Nikkei Business Online (September 9, 2014) "東京五輪招致を決定づけたパフォーマーたち　IOC評価委員会を熱狂させた最後の晩餐" https://web.archive.org/web/20160402011029/http://business.nikkeibp.co.jp/article/topics/20130908/253131/ (Japanese)
 artsBHAM (October 19, 2015) "Dance Review - enra" https://web.archive.org/web/20160424094626/http://www.artsbham.com/dance-review-enra/
 The Detroit News (October 21, 2015) "Japanese troupe, Enra, ties choreography to animation" http://www.detroitnews.com/story/entertainment/2015/10/21/japanese-troupe-enra-ties-choreography-animation/74321692/
 Mainichi Shimbun Digital (April 11, 2016) "国内初ツアー　言葉や文化の壁超えるストーリー" http://mainichi.jp/articles/20160411/mog/00m/040/012000c (Japanese)
 Culture Source, "enra fuses technology and dance in mesmerizing performance at The Berman", by Hillary Brody (October 21, 2015) https://web.archive.org/web/20160807032701/https://www.culturesource.org/201510212194/stories/enra-fuses-technology-and-dance-in-mesmerizing-performance-at-the-berman/
 The Huffington Post (January 2, 2014) "Japanese troupe enra combines dance and light in mesmerizing video" http://www.huffingtonpost.com/2014/01/02/enra-pleiades_n_4532918.html 
 Marketing Interactive (December 17, 2014) "WATCH SKII’s visually stunning campaign together with ENRA" http://www.marketing-interactive.com/skii-ropes-japanese-dance-troupe-festive-season-campaign/
 Jiji.com (November 15, 2016) "ついに日本で！！パフォーミングアーツカンパニー enra（エンラ）世界を魅了したパフォーマンスに大注目！" http://www.jiji.com/jc/article?k=000000363.000012949&g=prt (Japanese)
 Rafu Shimpo (October 20, 2016) "READY TO POP: Japan’s Enra brings its one-of-a-kind live dance and digital performance artistry to Hollywood this weekend" http://www.rafu.com/2016/10/ready-to-pop/
 Broadway World (October 21, 2016) "The Ricardo Montalbán Theatre Presents PROXIMA" http://www.broadwayworld.com/bwwdance/article/The-Ricardo-Montalbn-Theatre-Presents-PROXIMA-20161021
 Arca (October 2016) "ENRA, EL ESPECTÁCULO JAPONÉS MÁS SORPRENDENTE LLEGA A MÉXICO" https://web.archive.org/web/20161220073738/http://arca.tv/enra-el-espectaculo-japones-mas-sorprendente-llega-a-mexico/ (Spanish)

External links 
 enra Official Homepage

2012 establishments in Japan
Japanese artists
Japanese dance groups
Performing arts companies
Performing groups established in 2012